The 2021–22 Croatian Women's First Football League (Croatian: Prva hrvatska nogometna liga za žene) was the 31st season of Croatian Women's First Football League, the national championship for women's association football teams in Croatia, since its establishment in 1992. The season started on 5 September 2021 and ended on 29 May 2022.

The league was contested by eight teams. First stage was be played in a double round robin format, with each team playing every other team two times over 14 rounds. In a second stage teams were divided in two groups according to the table standings. ŽNK Osijek were the defending champions, having won their 23rd title in 2020–21.

Teams

The following is a complete list of teams who have secured a place in the 2021–22 Croatian Women's First Football League.

Regular season

League table

Results

Play-offs

Championship play-offs

League table

Results

Relegation play-offs

League table

Results

Relegation play-off
At the end of the season, seventh placed Donat will contest a two-legged relegation play-off tie against the losing team of promotion play-off tie between Hajduk Split and Viktorija.

First leg

Second leg

Donat won 9–0 on aggregate.

Top scorers
Updated to matches played on 29 May 2022.

References

External links
Croatian Women's First Football League at UEFA.com
Croatian Women's First Football League at Croatian Football Federation website

Croatian Women's First Football League seasons
Croatia
women
Football
Football